Thái Thụy is a rural district of Thái Bình province in the Red River Delta region of Vietnam. As of 2003 the district had a population of 267,012. The district covers an area of 257 km². The district capital lies at Diêm Điền. Thai Thuy is famous for Con Den beach which is far from Thai Binh city about 40km

References

Districts of Thái Bình province